Pietro Dib (13 June 1881 in Dlepta, Lebanon – 4 November 1965) was a Maronite bishop of the Maronite Catholic Eparchy of Cairo.

Life

Pietro Dib received his ordination to the priesthood on 16 March 1907.

In 1946 he was appointed by Pope Pius XII as Titular Bishop of Tarsus of Maronites and Bishop of the Eparchy of Cairo for the Maronites. His episcopal ordination was on July 5, 1946 and Dib was ordained bishop by Roman Catholic Archbishop of Lille, France, Achille Liénart; his co-consecrators were Jean-Julien Weber, Society of Saint-Sulpice, Bishop of Strasbourg, and Auguste Joseph Gaudel, Bishop of Fréjus. On 30 July of the same year Dib was appointed bishop to the Maronite Catholic Eparchy of Cairo.

Bishop Dib died on 4 November 1965.

References

External links
 Bishop Pietro Dib - Bishop of Le Caire {Cairo} (Maronite), Egypt

1881 births
1965 deaths
Lebanese Maronites
20th-century Maronite Catholic bishops